St Erth can refer to:

 Saint Erc, an early Irish saint in Cornwall
 St Erth, a parish and village in Cornwall, United Kingdom.
 St Erth gardens, Blackwood, Victoria, Australia
 St Erth railway station, a railway station near the village of St Erth.